Professional wrestling and mixed martial arts (also known as MMA) both combine grappling and strikes. In MMA, fights are competitions, in contrast to professional wrestling where the outcomes and moves performed are often scripted or predetermined. Despite this difference, several people have competed in both professional wrestling and MMA.

Comparison
Professional wrestling could be considered a performance art which combines athletics with theatrical performance. Matches are contested on a pre-determined basis, where the fight on display is merely for entertainment purposes. Viewers are integral to a professional wrestling match, as the audience is who the action is for. Professional wrestling mixes many styles of amateur wrestling, striking and showmanship to display a fight, whilst the two performers work together to achieve a "worked" fight. Professional wrestling was first popularized in the 19th century Europe as a carnival attraction.

Mixed Martial Arts, is a hybrid of many types of physical full-contact sports; including wrestling, boxing and Martial Arts, such as Brazilian Jiu-Jitsu. The early 1990s saw the Ultimate Fighting Championship popularize the term "Mixed Martial Arts", for such a bout. Competitors in MMA are generally skilled in many different styles, however, it is possible to be only proficient in one type of combat. As some professional wrestling moves are simply worked versions of legitimate holds, there can be a crossover between the two.

Possibly the most successful crossover pro wrestler and MMA competitor is Brock Lesnar, who has won the world championships in both the WWE and UFC. Other wrestlers to have won world championships in both MMA and Pro Wrestling include Bobby Lashley (Shark Fights Heavyweight Championship as well as the Impact World Championship, the ECW World Championship and the WWE Championship), and UFC Hall of Famers Dan Severn and Ken Shamrock, who won the UFC Superfight Championship and the NWA World Heavyweight Championship.

Rivalry
Since MMA's rise to prominence in the 1990s, some pro wrestlers or MMA fighters have been cynical against the other's profession. This can be an attack on the sport as a whole, or acting as a fan dismissing certain actions within that sport.

MMA records of professional wrestlers
Below is a list of professional wrestlers to have appeared in an official Mixed Martial Arts match, and their career win–loss record.

Men

Women

References

wrestling and mixed martial arts
Professional wrestling-related lists
Mixed martial arts lists